Naqqarchi Mahalleh (also Romanized as Naqqārchī Maḩalleh) is a village in Miandorud-e Kuchak Rural District, in the Central District of Sari County, Mazandaran Province, Iran. At the 2006 census, its population was 206, in 51 families.

References 

Populated places in Sari County